WJVC (96.1 FM, "My Country 96.1") is a country music radio station, licensed to Center Moriches, New York and serving eastern Long Island. The station is owned by JVC Media LLC with studios located in Ronkonkoma, New York and transmitter located in Manorville, New York.

Former logo

References

External links 
 

JVC
Mass media in Suffolk County, New York
Country radio stations in the United States
Radio stations established in 1996
1996 establishments in New York (state)